Wellington Sandoval Córdova is a surgeon and former politician of Ecuador, who served as the Minister of National Defence between August 31, 2007 and April 9, 2008. Since October 2008 he has served as his country's Ambassador to Argentina.

He holds a PhD from the Central University of Ecuador.

References

Ecuadorian surgeons
Living people
Year of birth missing (living people)
Defence ministers of Ecuador
Government ministers of Ecuador
Ambassadors of Ecuador to Argentina
PAIS Alliance politicians